The 2006 French motorcycle Grand Prix was the fifth race of the 2006 Motorcycle Grand Prix season. It took place on the weekend of 19–21 May 2006 at the Le Mans Bugatti circuit.

MotoGP classification

250 cc classification

125 cc classification

Championship standings after the race (MotoGP)

Below are the standings for the top five riders and constructors after round five has concluded.

Riders' Championship standings

Constructors' Championship standings

 Note: Only the top five positions are included for both sets of standings.

References

French motorcycle Grand Prix
French
Motorcycle Grand Prix
French motorcycle Grand Prix